AdventHealth Field, formerly known as Cook Field and Peoples Bank Field, is a sport stadium in Ottawa, Kansas, United States. The facility is primarily used by the Ottawa University football, lacrosse, soccer, and track & field teams. The field turf was added in 2007 and the facility is considered one of the best of its kind in the United States for small college football.

The stadium is also used for local high school sporting events and other community events.

Image gallery

References

College football venues
Sports venues in Kansas
Buildings and structures in Ottawa, Kansas
American football venues in Kansas
Ottawa Braves football